The 24th is an American historical drama film co-written and directed by Kevin Willmott. The film stars Trai Byers, Bashir Salahuddin, Aja Naomi King, Mo McRae, Tosin Morohunfola, Mykelti Williamson, and Thomas Haden Church. It tells the true story of the Houston riot of 1917.

Cast
 Trai Byers as Cpl William Boston
 Aja Naomi King as Marie
 Bashir Salahuddin as Big Joe
 Mo McRae as Walker
 Tosin Morohunfola as Franklin
 Mykelti Williamson as Sgt. Hayes
 Thomas Haden Church as Col. Norton
 Tanya Chisholm as Alice
 Christopher W. Norris as Military Defense Attorney
 Michael Rose as Carter Hammond

Plot
The 24th is based on the true story of the Houston riot of 1917. The film features an African-American (A.K.A. Buffalo Soldiers) military unit, the 24th Infantry Regiment in Houston, Texas. Despite their military service, the African-American soldiers are subjected to racial discrimination by the all white police force in Houston as well as from the local white people in Houston. The constant racial discrimination leads to a riot and seizure of military weapons by the African-American military unit against the police force and the white locals. The riot and resulting violence ended with multiple soldiers from the 24th being arrested and ultimately executed for mutiny.

Release
The film was scheduled to premiere at the 2020 South by Southwest festival, but the festival was cancelled due to the COVID-19 pandemic. The film was released digitally and through video on demand on August 21, 2020, by Vertical Entertainment.

Critical response
The 24th received generally positive reviews from critics. The site's critical consensus reads, "The 24th might have told its fact-based story more fully, but despite its flaws, it remains an overall compelling -- and woefully overdue -- reckoning with history."

References

External links
 

American films based on actual events
American historical drama films
Drama films based on actual events
Films postponed due to the COVID-19 pandemic
Films set in 1917
Films shot in North Carolina
2020 films
2020s English-language films
2020s historical drama films
2020 drama films
Films about racism
Films directed by Kevin Willmott
2020s American films
Films about capital punishment
Films scored by Alex Heffes